In quantum electrodynamics, the Uehling potential describes the interaction potential between
two electric charges which, in addition to the classical Coulomb potential, contains an extra term responsible for the electric polarization of the vacuum. This potential was found by Edwin Albrecht Uehling in 1935. 

Uehling's corrections take into account that the electromagnetic field of a point charge does not act instantaneously at a distance, but rather it is an interaction that takes place via exchange particles, the photons. In quantum field theory, due to the uncertainty principle between energy and time, a single photon can briefly form a virtual particle-antiparticle pair, that influences the point charge. This effect is called vacuum polarization, because it makes the vacuum appear like a polarizable medium. By far the dominant contribution comes from the lightest charged elementary particle, the electron. The corrections by Uehling are negligible in everyday practice, but it allows to calculate the spectral lines of hydrogen-like atoms with high precision.

Definition 
The Uehling potential is given by

from where it is apparent that this potential is a refinement of the classical Coulomb potential.

If , this potential simplifies to

while for  we have

where  is the Euler–Mascheroni constant (0.57721...).

Properties 

It was recently demonstrated that the above integral in the expression of  can be evaluated in closed form by using the modified Bessel functions of the second kind  and its successive integrals.

Effect on atomic spectra 

Since the Uehling potential only makes a significant contribution at small distances close to the nucleus, it mainly influences the energy of the s orbitals. Quantum mechanical perturbation theory can be used to calculate this influence in the atomic spectrum of atoms. The quantum electrodynamics corrections for the degenerated energy levels  of the hydrogen atom are given by

Here  stands for electronvolts.

Since the wave function of the s orbitals does not vanish at the origin, the corrections provided by the Uehling potential are of the order  (where  is the fine structure constant) and it becomes less important for orbitals with a higher azimuthal quantum number. This energy splitting in the spectra is about a ten times smaller than the fine structure corrections provided by the Dirac equation and this splitting is known as the Lamb shift (which includes Uehling potential and additional higher corrections from quantum electrodynamics).

The Uehling effect is also central to muonic hydrogen as most of the energy shift is due to vacuum polarization.

See also 
 QED vacuum
 Virtual particles
 Anomalous magnetic dipole moment
 Schwinger limit
 Schwinger effect
 Euler–Heisenberg Lagrangian

References

Further reading 
 More on the vacuum polarization in QED, see section 7.5 of M.E. Peskin and D.V. Schroeder, An Introduction to Quantum Field Theory, Addison-Wesley, 1995.

Quantum electrodynamics
Quantum mechanical potentials
Quantum field theory